June Palmer (1 August 1940 in London, England – 6 January 2004), also known as "June Power", was an English model and actress who, along with Pamela Green, was the most famous of the Harrison Marks glamour models of the 1960s, featured in his publications Kamera and Solo, and in his short films featuring nudity. She had measurements of 38–23–37.

Career
June Palmer began work as a topless dancer at the Windmill Theatre in London, and started modelling professionally in the late-1950s. She appeared in 8mm glamour films made by Harrison Marks (Flesh and Fantasie; Nightmare at Elm Manor; Photo Session; Star Strip; Dream Goddess; China Garden and The Naked World of June Palmer), Russell Gay (So Fur, So Good; Beauty and the Barn), Express Films (Body Beautiful ) and Arthur Howell (June in Orbit; Calamity June; Castaway; Mission Possible and Special Agent). She later played minor parts in movies, including The Naked World of Harrison Marks (1966), Taste the Blood of Dracula (1969), The Nine Ages of Nakedness (1969), Games That Lovers Play (1971) and On the Game (1974). Although she stopped modelling for magazines in 1970, Palmer continued to do some private modelling for London's various camera clubs until 1987.

Photographer Irv Carsten said this about Palmer in the March 1962 issue of Modern Man, "I felt ashamed using an automatic camera. Her posing is second nature, she's beautiful from any angle, and without camera settings to make, there's nothing to do but watch."

Personal life
In 1964, when she was 24 years old, Palmer married the then 44-year-old photographer/stuntman Arthur Howell. In the 1960s they had started and run Strobe Studios in Clapham, South London, an LCC-licensed model agency and photographic studio, which advertised in many of the photographic magazines such as Practical Photography. Strobe rented out their studio space to amateur and professional photographers, and provided them with the glamour models who were on Strobe's books as photographic subjects. Mary Millington (at that time using her married name Mary Maxted), Carole Augustine and Ava Cadell all worked as models for Strobe Studios in the early 1970s. Palmer divorced Howell in 2000 (he died in August 2003).

She married again and died on 6 January 2004.

References

External links

1940 births
2004 deaths
English female adult models
Glamour models